Jonas Djupvik Løvlie (born 14 October 1990) is a Norwegian ice hockey player. He is currently playing for Storhamar Ishockey. He took part in the 2014 and 2015 IIHF World Championships.

References

External links

1990 births
Living people
Lørenskog IK players
Manglerud Star Ishockey players
Norwegian ice hockey forwards
Södertälje SK players
Sparta Warriors players
Stavanger Oilers players
Storhamar Dragons players
Ice hockey people from Oslo
Norwegian expatriate ice hockey people
Norwegian expatriate sportspeople in Sweden